İstanbul Başakşehir Futbol Kulübü is a Turkish professional football club based in the Başakşehir district of Istanbul, Turkey. The club was founded in 1990 as İstanbul Büyükşehir Belediyespor. They first reached the highest level in Turkish Football in 2007–08.

Past seasons

Domestic results

League affiliation
 Süper Lig: 2007–13, 2014–
 TFF First League: 1993–95, 1997–07, 2013–14
 TFF Second League: 1992–93, 1995–97

References

Notes

External links
Official website

İstanbul Başakşehir F.K. seasons